The Action On Film International Film Festival, also known as the Action On Film Festival, was founded in 2004.  It was held in California until 2017 when it moved to the Palms Hotel and Casino in Las Vegas.  As a hub for many returning filmmakers, AOF has become an Official Distributor to SHORTS.TV as well as programming Feature Films for a number of Indie Theaters.

History 
The Action on Film International Film Festival was founded in 2004 by Del Weston.  After being disappointed by a bad experience, Weston sought to create a festival where filmmakers could showcase their films. It was first held in Long Beach, California as a part of the Long Beach International Martial Arts Championships.

In 2008, it moved to Pasadena, California.

In 2012, it moved to Monrovia, California.

In 2017, it was moved to Las Vegas, Nevada.

The festival accepts all major genres and is not limited to action films.

Major Awards 
Each year the festival recognizes outstanding actors and projects in nearly eighty categories including the Action On Film Lifetime Achievement Awards. Winners of this award are:

Icon Awards 
 Art Camacho
 Bill (Superfoot) Wallace 
 Bob Wall
 Cynthia Rock
 Don (The Dragon) Wilson
 Ronnie (Mr. Olympia) Coleman
 Tazito Garcia 
 HRH Prince Gharios El Chemor of Ghassan

Lifetime Achievement Award 
 David Carradine
 John Saxon
 Bill Duke
 John Savage
 W. Morgan Sheppard
 Talia Shire
 Bill Plympton
 James Best
 Robert Loggia
 Bo Svenson

The Alan Bailey Award For Excellence In The Craft Of Filmmaking In A Major Genre

 Neil Johnson - Science Fiction Starship Apocalypse
 Amber Benson - Comedy - Shevenge
 Christopher Di Nunzio - Guerilla Film- A Life Not to Follow-
 James Christopher - Best Indie Film Quad X: Rise of the Beaver Slayer
 Bryan Martin - Webisode- Dark Memories
 JD Glasscock - Film Noir Series

Half Life Award 
 Kim Coates
 Deborah Kara Unger
 Nick Mancuso
 Tom Sizemore
 Michael Paré

Maverick Award 
 Tracey Birdsall
 Talia Shire
 Michael Madsen
 David Carradine
 Michelle Lukes

References

External links 
 

Fantasy and horror film festivals in the United States
Film festivals in California
Film festivals established in 2004
2004 establishments in California